Goran Gutalj (born 12 November 1969) is a Slovenian football coach and former player who is the manager of Veržej. He played 176 matches in Slovenian PrvaLiga and scored 58 goals.

References

1969 births
Living people
Yugoslav footballers
Bosnia and Herzegovina footballers
Slovenian footballers
Association football forwards
FK Željezničar Sarajevo players
NK Mura players
NK Maribor players
NK Beltinci players
PFC CSKA Moscow players
ND Gorica players
Kapfenberger SV players
SV Allerheiligen players
Yugoslav First League players
Slovenian PrvaLiga players
Russian Premier League players
2. Liga (Austria) players
Slovenian expatriate footballers
Expatriate footballers in Russia
Slovenian expatriate sportspeople in Russia
Expatriate footballers in Austria
Slovenian expatriate sportspeople in Austria
Slovenian people of Bosnia and Herzegovina descent
Slovenian football managers